Sangar railway station is a small railway station in Jammu district, Jammu and Kashmir. Its code is SGRR. It serves Sangar city. The station consists of two platforms. The platforms are not well sheltered. It lacks many facilities including water and sanitation.

Major trains 

Some of the important trains that run from Sangar are:

 Udhampur – Jammu Tawi Passenger
 Pathankot – Udhampur DMU
 Katra – Jammu Tawi DMU

See also
 Jammu–Baramulla line
 Northern Railways
 List of railway stations in Jammu and Kashmir

References

External links

  Indian Railways

Railway stations in Jammu district
Firozpur railway division